SHORT syndrome is a medical condition in which affected individuals have multiple birth defects in different organ systems.

It was characterized in 1975.

Presentation
SHORT is an acronym for short stature, hyperextensibility of joints and/or inguinal hernia, ocular depression, Rieger anomaly and teething delay. Other characteristics common in SHORT syndrome are a triangular face, a prominent forehead, small chin with a dimple, a loss of fat under the skin (lipodystrophy), prominent ears (but no low implantation or posterior localisation), hearing loss and delayed speech. Facial lipodystrophy may be evident during birth and later on in the chest and higher extremities, but it usually won't affect buttocks and legs. Diabetes has been observed in ⅔ of the affected after they turn 15.

Diagnosis
Diagnosis is based on facial characteristics and molecular genetic testing that will show a mutation on gene PIK3R1 (5q13.1), which codifies the regulating alpha subunit of phosphatidylinositol 3-kinase. This mutation can alter the PI3K/AKT/mTOR signal route, which plays an important role in cell growth and proliferation.

Treatment
Treatment involves multiple disciplines. 

-Screening for insulin resistance during late childhood stage. 

-Glucose intolerance and diabetes mellitus can be treated with a different diet and lifestyle changes. 

-Regular eye checkups are recommended in order to keep vision. 

-Dental anomalies can be treated with common methods (protheses, crown, etc.)

References

External links 

Congenital disorders
Syndromes